USS Stout (DDG-55) is the fifth  guided missile destroyer. Built for the United States Navy by Ingalls Shipbuilding, she was commissioned on 13 August 1994 and she is currently home-ported in Naval Station Norfolk. She is part of Destroyer Squadron 26. Stout is named for Rear Admiral Herald F. Stout, who distinguished himself as the commanding officer of the destroyer  during World War II. In November 1943, Commander Stout received two Navy Crosses in the span of three weeks for his actions in the Pacific. Stout aided Destroyer Squadron 23 in sinking five heavily armed Japanese warships and damaging four others during the Solomon Islands campaign as well as sinking four more Japanese warships and damaging two others to establish a beachhead on Bougainville Island. Stout was ordered on 13 December 1988, the keel was laid down on 8 August 1991, she was launched on 16 October 1992 and commissioned on 13 August 1994. As of July 2020 the ship is part of Destroyer Squadron 26 based out of Naval Station Norfolk.

Ship history

Board of Inspection and Survey
In April 2008, the ship comprehensively failed her Board of Inspection and Survey examination and was declared "unfit for sustained combat operations." The ship has since passed 13 of 13 rigorous unit level training inspections. Stout deployed in March 2009 on routine security operations in the Sixth Fleet operational area. On 15 July 2009, Fox News Channel reported Stout was in the Black Sea cooperating with Georgian forces in training exercises.

Relief of Commanding Officer and Command Master Chief
On 1 March 2011 while on deployment to the Mediterranean Sea in support of the crisis in Libya, Commander Nathan Borchers, Command Master Chief Susan Bruce-Ross, six other chiefs, one junior officer, and one petty officer of Stout were relieved by the Commander Sixth Fleet. The cited cause was a "pervasive pattern of unprofessional behavior" among the ship's crew including "fraternization, orders violations and disregard for naval standards of conduct and behavior which contributed to poor crew morale and a hostile command climate."

Operation Odyssey Dawn

On 19 March 2011, in conjunction with other US Navy ships, the destroyer launched Tomahawk cruise missiles at Libyan air defenses as part of Operation Odyssey Dawn.

Syrian civil war
On 28 August 2013, the US Navy announced that a fifth Arleigh Burke-class destroyer, Stout, was en route to join the other four destroyers deployed in the eastern Mediterranean Sea amid allegations that the regime of Syrian President Bashar al-Assad used chemical weapons during the ongoing Syrian civil war, including the 2013 Ghouta attacks.

Navy record for longest stint at sea

On 3 October 2020, Stout moored in Rota, Spain, after 215 days consecutively at sea, surpassing the Navy's known record of 206 days at sea previously held by carrier  and cruiser . The unusually long deployment was as a result of the COVID-19 pandemic and operational requirements.

Honors and awards
On 16 February 2007, Stout was awarded the 2006 Battle "E".

Coat of Arms

Shield  
The battle axe is adapted from the Stout family's coat of arms. Its upright position underscores Stout'''s massive firepower and high survivability while the double axe head alludes to the all encompassing offensive and defensive power of the integrated AEGIS combat system. The star highlights Rear Admiral Stout's many awards, including the Silver Star. With resolute courage and daring aggressiveness, then Commander Stout aided his task force in sinking several Japanese warships to establish a beachhead on Bougainville Island. This Naval battle is symbolized by the wedge piercing the field of the shield. The wedge and field represents Rear Admiral Stout and the United States Navy's ability to disable and destroy a surface force of superior firepower.

 Crest 
The cross symbolizes the two Navy Crosses Rear Admiral Stout was awarded as well as exemplifies the strong devotion to God and Country that characterized his Naval career. It is inflamed to recall the fierce naval battle during the Solomon Islands campaign. The lion is a metaphor for the courage and strength which Rear Admiral Stout and his crew had during World War II and to those who have served on board Stout'' (DDG-55).

References

External links

 Navysite.de DDG-55
 

 

Arleigh Burke-class destroyers
Destroyers of the United States
Ships built in Pascagoula, Mississippi
1992 ships